This article lists the main target shooting events and their results for 2019.

World Events

International Shooting Sport Federation

ISSF World Cup
 2019 ISSF World Cup
 2019 ISSF Junior World Cup

International Confederation of Fullbore Rifle Associations

International Practical Shooting Confederation
 August 3-10: 2019 IPSC Rifle World Shoot in Karlskoga, Sweden

FITASC
2019 Results

Island Games
 July: Shooting at the 2019 Island Games in Gibraltar

Military World Games
 October 19-25: Shooting at the 2019 Military World Games in Wuhan, China

Summer Universiade
 July 4-9: Shooting at the 2019 Summer Universiade in Naples, Italy

Regional Events

Africa

African Games
 August 25-30: Shooting at the 2019 African Games in Morocco

African Shooting Championships
 November 17-25: 2019 African Shooting Championships in Tipasa, Algeria

Americas

Pan American Games
 August 8-10: Shooting at the 2019 Pan American Games in Lima, Peru

Parapan American Games
 Shooting at the 2019 Parapan American Games in Lima, Peru

Asia

Asian Shooting Championships
 March 25-April 2: 2019 Asian Airgun Championships in Taiwan
 November 5-13: 2019 Asian Shooting Championships in Qatar
 September 20-30: 2019 Asian Shotgun Championships in Kazakhstan

Oceania Shooting Championships
 November 2-8: 2019 Oceania Shooting Championships in Australia

Pacific Games
 July 15-19: Shooting at the 2019 Pacific Games in Samoa

Southeast Asian Games
 December 2-10: Shooting at the 2019 Southeast Asian Games in Lubao, Philippines

Europe

European Games
 June 22-28: Shooting at the 2019 European Games in Minsk, Belarus

European Shooting Confederation
 March 17-24: 2019 European 10 m Events Championships in Osijek, Croatia
 September 12-23: 2019 European Shooting Championships in Bologna & Tolmezzo, Italy
 September 3-17: 2019 European Shotgun Championships in Lonato del Garda, Italy
 July 8-15: 2019 European Running Target Championships in Gyenesdiás, Hungary

"B Matches"
 September 14-15: first AirOShoot Super Final held in Herent, Belgium
 January 31 - February 2: InterShoot in Den Haag, Netherlands
 December 11-14: RIAC held in Strassen, Luxembourg

National Events

United Kingdom

NRA Imperial Meeting
 July, held at the National Shooting Centre, Bisley
 Queen's Prize winner: 
 Grand Aggregate winner: ANR Walker
 Ashburton Shield winners: Royal Grammar School, Guildford
 Kolapore Winners: 
 National Trophy Winners: 
 Elcho Shield winners: 
 Vizianagram winners: House of Lords

NSRA National Meeting
 August, held at the National Shooting Centre, Bisley
 Earl Roberts British Prone Champion:

USA
 2019 NCAA Rifle Championships, won by TCU Horned Frogs

References

 
2019 in sports
2019 sport-related lists
2010s in shooting sports